Highland Park Market is a grocery chain based in Manchester, Connecticut, which operates five stores in Hartford and Tolland counties.

History
Originally constructed in 1886 by William White, John Devanney purchased the store in 1953 and incorporated it in 1960.

In October 1976, Highland Park opened a store in Coventry, which is owned and operated by Mary and David Miner, Devanney's daughter and son-in-law, and is operated independently from all the others. In March 1992, Highland Park Market of Glastonbury opened.

In December 1993, Timothy J. Devanney bought out his two brothers and proceeded to open a Highland Park Market in Farmington in 1995.  He expanded the Manchester store again in 1985 (the space was already devoted to the bakery and deli departments), opened a store in Suffield in 2001, and finally opened the sixth store South Windsor in 2005.

On June 30, 2010, the South Windsor store was closed due to lagging sales and the poor economic climate.

References

Supermarkets of the United States
Companies based in Manchester, Connecticut
1960 establishments in Connecticut